Colonial buildings and structures in Jakarta include those that were constructed during the Dutch colonial period of Indonesia. The period (and the subsequent style) succeeded the earlier period when Jakarta (known then as Jayakarta/Jacatra), governed by the Sultanate of Banten, were completely eradicated and replaced with a walled city of Batavia. The dominant styles of the colonial period can be divided into three periods: the Dutch Golden Age (17th to late 18th century), the transitional style period (late 18th century – 19th century), and Dutch modernism (20th century). Dutch colonial architecture in Jakarta is apparent in buildings such as houses or villas, churches, civic buildings, and offices, mostly concentrated in the administrative city of Central Jakarta and West Jakarta.

Below is a list of colonial buildings and structures found in Jakarta. The list is sorted alphabetically according to its official (local) name. The list can also be sorted to each category.

Buildings that were renovated in a manner that significantly changed their appearance are listed separately to distinguish the different architectural form.

Some notable Chinese-style buildings and Islamic mosques that were built during these period are included in the list for comparison.

Dutch East India Company period – 17th to late 18th century

The first type of colonial architecture grew from the early Dutch settlements in the 17th century when settlements were generally within walled defenses to protect them from attack by other European trade rivals and native revolt. Following the siege of Jayakarta (previously known as Sunda Kelapa) and its demolition by the Dutch in 1619, it was decided to build the headquarters of the Dutch East India Company on the site. Simon Stevin was commissioned to design a plan for the future settlement based on his concept of the 'ideal city'. His response was a rectangular, walled town, bisected by the river Ciliwung which was to be channeled into a straight canal (later known as also known as Grote Rivier or Kali Besar or "Big River" in this area). This new city is called Batavia (now Jakarta). In accordance with Stevin's model, the fortress of Batavia was the most prominent building in the city, symbolizing the center of power, while townhall, markets, and other public buildings were distributed. This layout of Jakarta can still be clearly recognized today in Jakarta Old Town through the layout of the streets and canals, although most of the original 17th structures had been destroyed or replaced with newer early 20th-century structures.

The architecture style of this period was the tropical counterparts of 17th-century Dutch architecture. Typical features include the typically Dutch high sash windows with split shutters, gable roofs, and white-coral painted wall (as opposed to exposed brick architecture in the Netherlands). This earlier period of Jakarta had many of the buildings solidly built with relatively enclosed structures, a structure that is not very friendly to tropical climate as compared to the architecture of the next period in Jakarta. The best examples of these types of buildings were located along the Tygersgracht (now Jalan Muka Timur) and all of them were demolished. The best surviving example is Toko Merah.

Several types of Portuguese colonial architecture also exist, usually outside the walled city of Batavia. Tugu Church and Sion Church, with their plain facades and domed windows, are some surviving examples.

In 1808, Daendels officially moved the city center to the south because of the deteriorating condition of the inner town as well as the malaria outbreak. As a result, many buildings and structures from this period were left to deteriorate. Because of financial issues, many buildings were demolished in the 19th century and the debris was used to construct newer structure in the south, such as the Palace of Governor-General Daendels (now the Financial Department of Indonesia) from the debris of Batavia Castle, and Batavia Theater (now Gedung Kesenian Jakarta) from the debris of the Spinhuis.

Later, these empty lots in Jakarta Old Town were filled with newer 20th-century structures. Surviving 17th–18th structures were later converted as Jakarta's cultural heritage, e.g. Toko Merah, Gereja Sion and Jakarta History Museum.

Other dominant architecture styles from this period were the Chinese merchant houses, many were built during the 18th century. Many of these structures show an eclectic mix of Dutch and Chinese influences.

Colonialism – late 18th century to 1870
After the VOC was formally dissolved in 1800 the Batavian Republic expanded all the VOC's territorial claims into a fully fledged colony named the Dutch East Indies. From the company's regional headquarters Batavia now evolved into the capital of the colony. In 1808 Daendels moved the old town center to higher ground to the south and urbanized the area known as Weltevreden. During the British interregnum Daendels was replaced by Raffles who governed until 1816.

As the Dutch become more securely established in the region, towns grew up beyond the walls of the fort. Batavia, together with Semarang and Ujung Pandang, were the most important urban centers. During this time, Batavia became congested and wealthier merchants and other powerful men began to build their residences on the outskirts of town and in the surrounding countryside.

The period shows a gradual adaptation to the tropical climate form on the part of the Dutch colonial architecture. These new form of architecture is called Indische Stijl. Typical style during this period include large roof overhang, high roof and ceiling, and front and rear verandahs that opened on to gardens. Indies style can be described as a mix of Indonesian, Chinese, and European influence. Very often the local Javanese style limasan roof was employed, but with addition of 19th-century European architectural elements such as Tuscan columns, doors, windows, and a flight of three to four steps leading up to a verandah running the full width of the house.

Neoclassicism was a popular style for buildings in Jakarta during this period, which is considered to be the best representation of the greatness of the empire.

Post Cultuurstelsel abolition – 1870 to mid 20th century

The abolition of the Cultuurstelsel in 1870 made way for the rapid development of private enterprises in the Dutch Indies. Numerous trading companies and financial institutions established themselves in Java, most of them settled in Batavia. Jakarta Old Town's deteriorating structures were replaced with offices, typically along the Kali Besar. These private companies owned or managed plantations, oil fields, and mines. Railway stations were designed during this period, with characteristic style of this period.

Architecturally, neoclassicism fell out of favor to be replaced by Neogothic and Dutch Rationalism. Apparent architectural style were Nieuwe Kunst (e.g. Bank Tabungan Negara), Art Deco or De Stijl, and Amsterdam School. This architecture styles were also the tropical counterpart of the original style, resulting in a style called New Indies Style.

Two dominant architectural bureaus during this period were AIA Bureau (Frans Ghijsels) and AA Fermont and Cuypers Bureau (Eduard Cuypers).

Colonnades are required during this period to provide protection against monsoon rains and tropical sun, which in turn transformed the appearance of buildings in the city centers.

Colonial style in Jakarta lingered some years after the Japanese occupation of Indonesia in 1942, and further after the independence of Indonesia in 1945.

See also
History of Jakarta
Dutch Indies country houses
New Indies Style
Colonial architecture of Indonesia
Dutch colonial architecture

Notes and references

Notes

References

Cited works